Matenja Vas is a village south of Postojna in the Inner Carniola region of Slovenia.

Church

The parish church in the settlement is dedicated to John the Baptist and belongs to the Koper Diocese. It was built in the mid-17th century on the site of an older chapel.

References

External links

Matenja Vas on Geopedia

Populated places in the Municipality of Postojna